The intermunicipal community is a type of administrative division in Portugal. Since the 2013 local government reform, there are 21 intermunicipal communities. They replaced the urban communities, the intermunicipal communities for general purposes and some metropolitan areas that were created in 2003, and abolished in 2008. The territories of the intermunicipal communities are the basis of the NUTS III statistical regions.

The branches of administration of the intermunicipal community are the intermunicipal assembly, the intermunicipal council, the intermunicipal executive secretariat and the strategic board for intermunicipal development. The intermunicipal assembly is composed of elected members of the municipal assemblies of the municipalities. The intermunicipal council is composed of the presidents of the municipal chambers of the municipalities.

List
The intermunicipal communities are:

 Alentejo Central
 Alentejo Litoral
 Algarve
 Alto Alentejo
 Alto Minho
 Alto Tâmega 
 Ave 
 Baixo Alentejo
 Beira Baixa
 Beiras e Serra da Estrela
 Cávado
 Douro 
 Lezíria do Tejo
 Médio Tejo
 Oeste 
 Região de Aveiro 
 Região de Coimbra 
 Região de Leiria
 Tâmega e Sousa
 Terras de Trás-os-Montes
 Viseu Dão Lafões

References

 
Subdivisions of Portugal